This is an article for a museum in Burkina Faso. For the museum in the USA, see National Music Museum.

The National Museum of Music is in Ouagadougou, (Burkina Faso) in a two-story building on Oubritenga Avenue on the south side of the Phillipe Zinda Kabore School.  

The building that once housed the Association for the Development of African Architecture and Urban Planning (ADAUA) was renovated to accommodate the museum. The building is in Sudanese Sahelian style with dome-shaped roofs. It is in the centre of the city and is easily accessible to the general public.

The first collection, put together between September 1998 and March 1999, is constantly growing. Instruments from all families are represented including aerophones, membranophones, idiophones and chordophones. Each object is the only one of its kind and varies from 5 to 200 years in age.

The museum is headed by the curator, Parfait Z. Bambara

See also 
 List of music museums

References
Burkina Faso Cultural Heritage Branch

Museums in Burkina Faso
Music organisations based in Burkina Faso
Buildings and structures in Ouagadougou
Music museums
Burkina Faso
Arts organisations based in Burkina Faso